Oberfähnrich zur See (OFähnr zS or OFRZS) designates in the German Navy of the Bundeswehr a military person or member of the armed forces with the last or highest Officer Aspirant (OA – ) rank. According to the salary class it is equivalent to the Portepeeunteroffizier ranks Hauptbootsmann (Marine) and Hauptfeldwebel of Heer or Luftwaffe.

It is also grouped as OR-7 in NATO, equivalent to First Sergeant,  Master Sergeant, or Senior Chief Petty Officer  in the US Armed forces, and to Warrant Officer Class 2 in the British Army and Royal Navy.

In navy context NCOs of this rank were formally addressed as Herr Oberfähnrich zur See also informally / short Oberfähnrich.

The sequence of ranks (top-down approach) in that particular group is as follows:
OR-9: Oberstabsbootsmann / Oberstabsfeldwebel
OR-8: Stabsbootsmann / Stabsfeldwebel
OR-7: Oberfähnrich zur See and Hauptbootsmann / Oberfähnrich and Hauptfeldwebel
OR-6a: Oberbootsmann / Oberfeldwebel
OR-6b: Fähnrich zur See and Bootsmann / Fähnrich and Feldwebel

Particularity 
The top-down sequence of German Marine midshipman ranks is as follows:
 Oberfähnrich zur See
 Fähnrich zur See
 Seekadett

Already below the lowest officer designated rank "Seekadett" any military person, assigned to an officer career, has to wear additionally to the particular rank the two capital letters “OA”, indicating to the “Officer Aspirant” career. The "nautical star" symbolises the "OA" career.

See also 
 Ranks of the German Bundeswehr
 Rank insignia of the German Bundeswehr

References

Naval ranks of Germany